Curry County is a county located in the U.S. state of New Mexico. As of the 2010 census, its population was 48,376. Its county seat is Clovis. The county is named in honor of George Curry, territorial governor of New Mexico from 1907 to 1910.

Curry County comprises the Clovis, New Mexico micropolitan statistical area, which is also included in the Clovis–Portales combined statistical area. It is located on the far eastern state line, adjacent to Texas, forming part of the region of Eastern New Mexico.

Geography
It is the fourth-smallest county in New Mexico by area.

Adjacent counties
 Quay County - northwest
 Roosevelt County - south
 Bailey County, Texas - southeast
 Parmer County, Texas - east
 Deaf Smith County, Texas - northeast

Demographics

2010 census
As of the 2010 census,  48,376 people, 18,015 households, and 12,341 families were living in the county. The 20,062 housing units averaged . The racial makeup of the county was 69.7% white, 6.3% African American, 1.3% Asian, 1.2% American Indian, 0.1% Pacific Islander, 17.2% from other races, and 4.1% from two or more races. Those of Hispanic or Latino origin made up 39.5% of the population. In terms of ancestry, 11.2% were German, 11.0% were American, 8.0% were Irish, and 6.7% were English.

Of the 18,015 households, 37.8% had children under the age of 18 living with them, 49.0% were married couples living together, 14.2% had a female householder with no husband present, 31.5% were not families, and 26.4% of all households were made up of individuals. The average household size was 2.63, and the average family size was 3.18. The median age was 31.5 years.

Males had a median income of $35,743 versus $26,585 for females. The per capita income for the county was $19,925. About 15.5% of families and 20.1% of the population were below the poverty line, including 28.9% of those under age 18 and 13.5% of those age 65 or over.

2000 census
As of the 2000 census, 45,044 people, 16,766 households, and 11,870 families were living in the county. The population density was 32 people per sq mi (12/km2). The 19,212 housing units averagedf 14 per sqmi (5/km2). The racial makeup of the county was 72.40% White, 6.86% African American, 1.00% Native American, 1.78% Asian, 0.13% Pacific Islander, 14.08% from other races, and 3.75% from two or more races. About 30.38% of the population were Hispanic or Latino of any race.

Of the 16,766 households,  38.00% had children under the age of 18 living with them, 54.00% were married couples living together, 12.80% had a female householder with no husband present, and 29.20% were not families. About 25.50% of all households were made up of individuals, and 9.00% had someone living alone who was 65 years of age or older. The average household size was 2.62, and the average family size was 3.15.

In the county, the age distribution was 30.10% under 18, 11.50% from 18 to 24, 28.80% from 25 to 44, 18.10% from 45 to 64, and 11.50% who were 65 or older. The median age was 31 years. For every 100 females, there were 97.60 males. For every 100 females age 18 and over, there were 94.30 males.

The median income for a household in the county was $28,917, and for a family was $33,900. Males had a median income of $25,086 versus $19,523 for females. The per capita income for the county was $15,049. About 15.50% of families and 19.00% of the population were below the poverty line, including 25.10% of those under age 18 and 14.30% of those age 65 or over.

Communities

Cities
 Clovis (county seat)
 Texico

Villages
 Grady
 Melrose

Census-designated place
 Cannon AFB

Unincorporated communities
 Bellview
 Broadview
 Gallaher
 Pleasant Hill
 Portair
 Ranchvale
 St. Vrain

Politics
Like much of Eastern New Mexico, Curry County normally votes conservative, having not voted for a Democrat for President since 1964.

Education
School districts include:
 Clovis Municipal Schools
 Grady Municipal Schools
 Melrose Public Schools
 Texico Municipal Schools

See also
 National Register of Historic Places listings in Curry County, New Mexico
 USS Curry County (LST-685)

References

External links
 Curry County Fair information, 2006
 Curry County information on High Plains Historical Foundation
 A resource for the Clovis/ Portales/ Curry/ Roosevelt and Cannon Air Force Base Community

 
1909 establishments in New Mexico Territory
Populated places established in 1909